Nicolás Capogrosso (born 15 January 1995) is an Argentine beach volleyball player. He competed in the 2020 Summer Olympics.

References

External links
 
 
 
 
 

1995 births
Living people
Sportspeople from Rosario, Santa Fe
Beach volleyball players at the 2020 Summer Olympics
Argentine beach volleyball players
Olympic beach volleyball players of Argentina
Pan American Games medalists in volleyball
Pan American Games bronze medalists for Argentina
Beach volleyball players at the 2019 Pan American Games
Medalists at the 2019 Pan American Games
21st-century Argentine people
Competitors at the 2022 South American Games
South American Games silver medalists for Argentina